Tajiks are a Persian-speaking Iranian ethnic group native to Central Asia.

Tajiks may also refer to: 

 Tajiks of Xinjiang, a minority in China who speak different Pamir languages
 Pamiri people, speakers of Pamir languages
 Persian peoples, a historic  term used for ethnic Persians in general 
 Iranians (disambiguation), a historic  term used for Iranians in general